Orka is a new-generation lightweight torpedo developed by Roketsan for the Turkish Navy.

History
The development project for Orka was launched by end December 2020. The project is realized by Roketsan along with Aselsan. The lightweight torpedo can be deployed from surface combatants, helicopters, maritime patrol aircraft and unmanned aerial vehicles for underwater targets.

Features
It has an underwater shock-insensitive warhead. Guided internally, the lightweight torpedo has active/passive sonar head and is capable of acoustic countermeasure.

See also
 Mark 54 Lightweight Torpedo
 APR-3E torpedo - Russian equivalent
 A244-S - Italian equivalent
 MU90 Impact - French/Italian equivalent
 Sting Ray (torpedo) - British equivalent
 TAL Shyena - Indian equivalent
 Yu-7 torpedo - Chinese equivalent
 K745 Chung Sang Eo - South Korean equivalent

References

Torpedoes of Turkey
Aerial torpedoes
Military equipment introduced in the 2000s
Orka